Pesticide residues are of concern in New Zealand and foods are regularly checked to see if they are within set limits.

Food Standards Australia New Zealand develops the standards for levels of pesticide residues in foods through a consultation process and the New Zealand Food Safety Authority publishes the maximum limits of pesticide residues for foods produced in New Zealand.

Pesticide residues tested in 1997 were generally low and thought to pose no detectable threat to health. More recent research shows a link between pesticides and Parkinson's disease, and on the foetus.

The Soil & Health Association of New Zealand and the Pesticide Action Network Aotearoa New Zealand claim that the 2010 results are the worst ever. Some of the results include:

 Pesticide residues found in 94% of targeted fruit and vegetable samples
 Prohibited endosulfan in 11 of 23 cucumber samples
 Dangerous fungicide exceeding allowable levels in 9 out of 24 Pak choi samples
 18 different pesticides found among 24 grape samples

The Green Party would prefer to see the precautionary principle used for potentially hazardous chemicals, as practised in the European Union.

See also
Pesticides in New Zealand
DDT in New Zealand
Food safety in New Zealand
Environment of New Zealand
Agriculture in New Zealand

References

External links
Pesticide maximum residue limits at the New Zealand Food Safety Authority

Environmental issues in New Zealand
Pesticides in New Zealand